Lawrence Whelan Ward (15 June 1929 – 7 February 2021) was an English professional footballer who played as a striker for both Bradford clubs.

Career
Born in Ovenden, England, Whelan Ward was a diminutive striker, standing just , who had unsuccessful trials with Bradford Park Avenue, Leeds United, Hull City and Halifax Town. He was signed by Bradford City manager David Steele, who had him on schoolboy forms at Huddersfield Town, from Ovenden in November 1948.

Ward made his City debut on Christmas Day 1948 against Oldham Athletic. He spent six seasons at Valley Parade scoring a total of 37 league goals and five FA Cup goals in 156 appearances. He was the club's top goal-scorer in 1951–52 and featured in the club's smallest attacking line-up against Darlington in October 1962.

He moved to King's Lynn in August 1954 but returned to Bradford the following year to sign for City's rivals Bradford Park Avenue. He spent four seasons with Park Avenue, returning to non-league football in August 1959 with Nelson.

Ward died in February 2021 at the age of 91.

References

1929 births
2021 deaths
Association football forwards
Bradford (Park Avenue) A.F.C. players
Bradford City A.F.C. players
English Football League players
English footballers
King's Lynn F.C. players
Nelson F.C. players
Footballers from Halifax, West Yorkshire
Date of death missing
Place of death missing